Love & Hip Hop is a media franchise that consists of several reality television series broadcast on VH1. The shows document the personal and professional lives of several hip hop and R&B musicians, performers, managers, and record producers residing in various metropolitan areas of the United States. The original franchise version, Love & Hip Hop: New York, premiered on March 6, 2011. Its success resulted in spin-offs based in Atlanta, Hollywood, and Miami.

The series is known for its sprawling ensemble cast, with over 250 cast members. Many are notable figures in hip hop, including Jim Jones, Remy Ma, Soulja Boy, Waka Flocka Flame, Lil Scrappy, Trina and Trick Daddy, as well as R&B artists like Ray J, Keyshia Cole and music producer Stevie J. The franchise is also known for launching the careers of previously unknown artists, including Joseline Hernandez, K. Michelle and Cardi B.

The franchise has generated controversy since its inception, and is often criticized for tending towards a narrative format more commonly seen in scripted genres such as soap operas, and appearing to fabricate much of its story line. However, it is one of the highest rated unscripted franchises in cable television history, and has been described as a "guilty pleasure".

The show aired continuously from May 5, 2014 until May 11, 2020, with an incarnation of the franchise airing nearly every Monday on VH1. In the US, Love & Hip Hop: Atlanta usually aired in spring and through summer, followed by Love & Hip Hop: Hollywood in the fall and Love & Hip Hop: New York and Love & Hip Hop: Miami in the winter. In early 2020, production on the franchise was shut down due to the COVID-19 pandemic, forcing the series off air for the first time in 6 years.

The franchise returned in a series of specials and spin offs from January 4, 2021, crossing-over cast members from all four incarnations.

As of May 11, 2020, 431 original episodes of New York, Atlanta, Hollywood and Miami have aired over 28 seasons.

Franchise history

Beginnings (2006–11)
In 2006, rapper Jim Jones approached VH1 executives to make a reality show about him. Jim Ackerman, senior vice president of development and production at the time, paired him with producers Stefan Springman and Toby Barraud of NFGTV, who produced the 11-minute presentation tape Keeping Up with the Joneses, which also featured Jones' longtime girlfriend Chrissy Lampkin and his mother Nancy. VH1 were unsure if audiences would be invested in the concept full-time and Jones' manager, Yandy Smith, approached Mona Scott-Young, her former employer at Violator, to retool the show. The concept was tweaked to include Jim's girlfriend Chrissy Lampkin and her circle of friends, influenced by the female ensemble-driven reality shows of the time.

The series was first announced in VH1's programming development report in April 2010, under the title Diary of a Hip Hop Girlfriend.

On January 4, 2011, VH1 announced that Love & Hip Hop would debut on March 6, 2011. The show would begin as an eight-episode series and star Chrissy, Jim Jones and his mother Nancy, along with Olivia Longott and her manager Rich Dollaz, Swizz Beatz's ex-wife Mashonda Tifrere and stylist Emily Bustamante, the mother of Fabolous's son. The first season was later expanded to nine episodes in order to include the first season reunion, which aired on May 16, 2011. Jon Caramanica of The New York Times praised the show's deconstruction of the public image of rappers, as well as the quality of the production values with "slick, beautiful shots of the women driving spectacular cars with no men in sight". However, he was critical of the "needless filler drama", a criticism that was shared by other critics who felt the "endless catty arguments and trashy behavior" detracted from the show's message and was too derivative of The Real Housewives franchise.

Breakthrough (2011–14)
On May 25, 2011, Love & Hip Hop was renewed for a second season, which premiered on November 14, 2011. The season saw the addition of Kimbella Vanderhee, the girlfriend of Juelz Santana, and Yandy Smith, Jim Jones' manager, to the cast, with Teairra Marí and video vixen Erica Mena in supporting roles. The season garnered big ratings for the network, averaging 2.8 million total viewers per episode, making it VH1's highest rated series in over three and a half years.

On February 6, 2012, during the finale of Love & Hip Hops second season, series creator Mona Scott-Young officially announced that an Atlanta-based spin-off of Love & Hip Hop, then titled Love & Hip Hop: Hotlanta, was in production. On May 15, 2012, VH1 announced Love & Hip Hop: Atlanta would make its series premiere on June 18, 2012. The show premiered to a storm of controversy, with some viewers calling for a boycott for its seemingly negative and stereotypical portrayal of black women. One petition described the show as "another beautifully-blinged jewel of commercial exploitation" for its focus on dysfunctional relationships, materialism, hyper-sexuality and violence. The love triangle between former Bad Boy Records producer Stevie J, his baby mama Mimi Faust and Joseline Hernandez, an ex-stripper-turned-aspiring artist who has an abortion in an early episode, garnered significant media attention, as did singer and breakout star K. Michelle's domestic violence storyline and Lil Scrappy's mother Momma Dee, who admits to being a former pimp. After the show's premiere, its audience grew substantially over the season, garnering even higher ratings than its predecessor. Its finale garnered 5.5 million people overall. On December 16, 2012, VH1 aired Dirty Little Secrets, a special featuring unseen footage, deleted scenes and interviews with the show's cast and producers. The special garnered 1.22 million viewers.

On September 7, 2012, VH1 announced that Chrissy Lampkin and Jim Jones would leave Love & Hip Hop, to star in their own spin-off show Chrissy & Mr. Jones, which premiered September 24, 2012.

The third season of Love & Hip Hop, now titled Love & Hip Hop: New York in promotional material, premiered on January 7, 2013. The show featured nearly a whole new cast, including Joe Budden, Consequence and their significant others. The season had a mixed reception from audiences, garnering the lowest ratings in the franchise's history at that point.

On April 1, 2013, VH1 announced that Love & Hip Hop: Atlanta would be returning for a second season on April 22, 2013. The show's ratings continued to grow, with an average of 3.27 million viewers per episode. During the season's reunion special, K. Michelle announced that she was leaving the show to join the cast of Love & Hip Hop: New York.

On October 10, 2013, VH1 announced Love & Hip Hop: New York would be returning for a fourth season on October 28, 2013. The season would premiere back to back with the second and final season of Chrissy & Mr. Jones. It was preceded on October 24, 2013 by 40 Greatest Love & Hip Hop Moments, a 2-hour clip show special hosted by Mona Scott-Young, and showcased the franchise's most "shocking, scandalous and dramatic Love & Hip Hop moments", featuring clips from the show's first three seasons, as well as the first two seasons of its spin-off Love & Hip Hop: Atlanta. Love & Hip Hop: New Yorks leading storyline for season four involved a dysfunctional love triangle (reminiscent of the more popular Love & Hip Hop: Atlanta) between rapper Peter Gunz, his baby mama Tara Wallace and his wife, singer Amina Buddafly. The show's ratings improved significantly, up 54% over the previous season's average and attracting an average of 3 million total viewers per episode.

Peak (2014–17)
On April 14, 2014, VH1 announced that Love & Hip Hop: Atlanta would be returning for a third season on May 5, 2014. From this point on, the show would air continuously, with an incarnation of the franchise airing nearly every Monday on VH1. The season was a huge ratings success, with the series premiere having a combined rating of 5.6 million viewers and continuing to set ratings records throughout the season. The outrageous storylines and scandals, particularly Mimi and Nikko's sex tape, Benzino's non-fatal shooting and Joseline and Stevie's violent behavior at the reunion special, garnered a media storm and made its cast members tabloid fixtures.

On August 18, 2014, VH1 announced Love & Hip Hop: Hollywood, the Los Angeles-based spin-off of Love & Hip Hop, would make its series premiere on September 15, 2014. The show was notable for its high-profile cast, with the youngest and most established group of cast members in the franchise thus far, including Ray J, B2K's Omarion and Lil' Fizz, Soulja Boy and their significant others. On October 15, 2014, VH1 announced that K. Michelle would leave Love & Hip Hop: New York to star in her own spin-off show K. Michelle: My Life. The show would premiere on November 3, 2014 after Love & Hip Hop: Hollywoods eighth episode and run for six weeks.

On December 2, 2014, VH1 announced that Love & Hip Hop: New York would be returning for a fifth season on December 15, 2014.

On April 9, 2015, VH1 announced that Love & Hip Hop: Atlanta would be returning for a fourth season on April 20, 2015, and would premiere alongside Love & Hip Hop Atlanta: The Afterparty Live!, a half-hour-long interactive after-show hosted by Big Tigger. The series premiere garnered big ratings for the network, with VH1 announcing a combined rating of 6.2 million viewers. On August 19, 2015, VH1 announced the season as the summer's #1 cable reality series among adults 18-49 and women 18-49 and the 2nd most talked-about television series on social media overall. Love & Hip Hop: The Wedding, a two-hour special featuring the marriage between Love & Hip Hop: New York cast members Yandy Smith and Mendeecees Harris, aired live VH1 on May 25, 2015, in between Love & Hip Hop: Atlantas fifth and sixth episodes of the season. The special aired to over 2 million viewers and featured appearances from other VH1 reality stars, including cast mates from Love & Hip Hop: Atlanta, Love & Hip Hop: Hollywood, Black Ink Crew, Mob Wives, as well as from Bravo's The Real Housewives of Atlanta.

On August 10, 2015, VH1 announced that Love & Hip Hop: Hollywood would be returning for a second season on September 7, 2015. The series premiere garnered big ratings for the network, with VH1 announcing a combined rating of 3.6 million viewers. The season featured the franchise's first openly gay couple Milan Christopher and Miles Brock, and several episodes featured public service announcements aimed to help viewers struggling with their sexual identity. On October 12, 2015, VH1 announced that Love & Hip Hop: Out in Hip Hop, a round-table discussion moderated by T. J. Holmes of ABC News, would air on October 19, 2015. The special focused on the reality on being openly LGBT in the hip hop community, and coincided with the airing of the seventh episode of the season, in which bisexual cast member Miles comes out to his ex-girlfriend Amber. It garnered 1.5 million viewers, ranking No. 1 among women 18–49 in its time period.

On July 7, 2015, shortly after her release from prison, Remy Ma announced that she was joining Love & Hip Hop: New York, along with her husband Papoose. On November 2, 2015, VH1 announced that Love & Hip Hop: New York would be returning for a sixth season on December 14, 2015. The season would feature an entirely new opening credits sequence and visual aesthetic, subsequent seasons of Atlanta and Hollywood would follow suit. The cast would undergo a major cast change for the third time in the show's history, with its storylines focusing more on the struggles of female rappers in the industry than ever before. The season was also notable for the addition of social media personality and aspiring rapper Cardi B, who was dubbed the show's breakout star. On August 27, 2015, VH1 confirmed that Love & Hip Hop: Atlanta stars Stevie J and Joseline Hernandez would star in their own spin-off series, set in Los Angeles. On December 2, 2015, VH1 announced that Stevie J & Joseline: Go Hollywood would premiere on January 25, 2016, back to back with the second season of K. Michelle: My Life, after Love & Hip Hop: New Yorks seventh episode of the season.

Love & Hip Hop: Atlanta returned for a fifth season on April 4, 2016.

On August 8, 2016, VH1 and 345 Games announced the release of Love & Hip Hop: The Game, a mobile game for iOS and Android. It was released worldwide on September 22, 2016.

Love & Hip Hop: Hollywood returned for a third season on August 15, 2016.

On November 14, 2016, VH1 announced that Love & Hip Hop: New York would be returning for a seventh season on November 21, 2016. On December 1, 2016, VH1 announced the spin-off Leave It To Stevie, featuring Stevie J's life as a bachelor after his break up with Joseline. The show would make its series premiere on December 19, 2016, back-to-back with the third and final season of K. Michelle: My Life, after Love & Hip Hop: New Yorks seventh episode of the season. On December 30, 2016, Cardi B announced that she was leaving Love & Hip Hop: New York to focus on her rap career.

On February 21, 2017, VH1 announced Love & Hip Hop: Atlanta would be returning for a sixth season on March 6, 2017. The series premiere garnered big ratings for the network, with VH1 announcing a combined rating of 5.2 million viewers, up 17% from its fifth season bow. On April 19, 2017, VH1 announced Joseline's Special Delivery, a special documenting the birth of Joseline's child with Stevie J. The special aired between the season's eighth and ninth episodes on May 1, 2017 and garnered 2.18 million viewers. Dirty Little Secrets 2, a special featuring unseen footage and deleted scenes, aired on May 10, 2017. With this season, Love & Hip Hop: Atlanta became the first incarnation of the franchise to reach 100 episodes. Production on the season became increasingly troubled, with later episodes showing scenes of Joseline Hernandez breaking the fourth wall to express her displeasure with the producers. Behind the scenes during the reunion taping on June 1, 2017, tensions between Joseline, Mona Scott-Young and the other producers exploded, with Joseline announcing that she had quit the show after six seasons. This would be a turning point for the franchise as ratings would begin to decline from that point forwards.

On April 13, 2017, VH1 announced that Keyshia Cole would be joining the cast of Love & Hip Hop: Hollywood in season four, which would premiere on July 24, 2017. Three weeks before the season four premiere, VH1 aired Dirty Little Secrets, a special featuring unseen footage and deleted scenes from the show's first three seasons, along with interviews with the show's cast and producers.

Ratings decline (2017–19)
On October 2, 2017, VH1 announced that Love & Hip Hop: New York would return for an eighth season on October 30, 2017. The season would feature an entirely new opening credits sequence and visual aesthetic, as before, subsequent seasons of Atlanta and Hollywood would follow suit. Two weeks before the season eight premiere, VH1 aired Dirty Little Secrets, a special featuring unseen footage and deleted scenes from the show's first seven seasons, along with interviews with the show's cast and producers. On November 16, 2017, VH1 announced that Remy & Papoose: A Merry Mackie Holiday, a holiday special starring Remy Ma and Papoose, would air on December 18, 2017. On February 12, VH1 aired Love & Hip Hop: The Love Edition, a Valentine's Day special featuring clips from the show and interviews with cast members from all franchises. This season was poorly received by viewers, with ratings dipping below 2 million viewers for the first time in four years.

On October 30, 2017, VH1 announced Love & Hip Hop: Miami, the Miami-based spin-off of Love & Hip Hop, would make its series premiere on January 1, 2018, after Love & Hip Hop: New Yorks tenth episode of the season. The series is notable for its diverse cast, reflecting Miami's racially and economically diverse community. The storyline involving Afro-Latina star Amara La Negra was praised by critics for "inviting cultural conversations" about misogynoir and the underrepresentation of Afro-Latinas in mainstream entertainment.

On February 16, 2018, VH1 announced Love & Hip Hop: Atlanta would return for the seventh season on March 19, 2018. The season garnered the lowest ratings in the show's history, with its premiere episode down over a million viewers compared to last season. The second and final season of the spin-off Leave It To Stevie would premiere on March 26, 2018, after Love & Hip Hop: Atlantas second episode of the season.

On June 18, 2018, VH1 announced Love & Hip Hop: Hollywood would return for the fifth season on July 23, 2018. Despite continuing the franchise's overall ratings decline, the season's over-the-top storylines were well received by fans and critics, with writer Michael Arceneaux praising the season for providing a "ratchet good time" and "making Love & Hip Hop great again". On September 24, 2018, VH1 aired Ray J & Princess' Labor of Love, a special featuring Ray J and Princess Love, as they prepare for the birth of their daughter. On September 17, 2018, VH1 announced that Remy Ma and Papoose would star in their own spin-off, Remy & Papoose: Meet the Mackies. The show would air October 1, 2018 after Love & Hip Hop: Hollywoods eleventh episode of the season and run for three weeks.

On September 27, 2018, VH1 announced Love & Hip Hop: New York would return for the ninth season on November 26, 2018. The season would be accompanied by an official podcast, Love & Hip Hop: The Tea, hosted by Jesse Janedy, TK Trinidad and Lem Gonsalves.

On November 19, 2018, VH1 announced Love & Hip Hop: Miami would return for a second season on January 2, 2019. The season aired on Wednesday nights at 8pm/7c for the first two episodes, before being moved to 10pm/9c after Black Ink Crew: Chicago. After three weeks of low ratings, the show was moved back to Monday nights at 9pm/8c after Love & Hip Hop: New York.

On February 25, 2019, VH1 announced Love & Hip Hop: Atlanta would return for the eighth season on March 25, 2019. On April 1, 2019, VH1 aired Love & Hip Hop Awards: Most Certified, a special hosted by Tami Roman and DC Young Fly, featuring Love & Hip Hop franchise cast members being awarded in various categories. On April 5, 2019, VH1 announced another clip show special, 40 Greatest Love & Hip Hop Moments: The Reboot, would air April 8, 2019. The cast of the show would win the Best Reality Royalty Award at the 2019 MTV Movie & TV Awards.

Production changes (2019–20)
On October 23, 2018, VH1 announced that they had taken Eastern TV off Love & Hip Hop: Hollywood, inviting "new producers to come and pitch" as they look to take the show in a "new direction". On July 8, 2019, VH1 announced Love & Hip Hop: Hollywood would return for the sixth season on August 5, 2019, with Big Fish Entertainment taking over as the show's production company. Despite VH1 initially announcing that there would be no other production changes, Eastern TV would be taken off the franchise entirely, with Big Fish Entertainment producing all subsequent seasons of New York, Miami and Atlanta. Season six of Hollywood would be the first of the franchise without its trademark cinematic aesthetic and high budget production values, instead resembling Big Fish Entertainment's other VH1 productions, such as Black Ink Crew. Reactions to the show's visual changes were mixed to negative, with former main cast member Hazel-E tweeting "It went from #Hollywood to the hood". The season had the lowest-rated premiere episode in the show's history, dipping under 2 million viewers for the first time.

On September 12, 2019, it was reported that several former cast members would return to Love & Hip Hop: New York in its tenth anniversary. On November 4, 2019, VH1 confirmed that Love & Hip Hop: New York would return for a tenth season on December 16, 2019, with original cast members Chrissy Lampkin, Jim Jones, Olivia Longott and Somaya Reece rejoining the cast, along with Erica Mena and Tahiry Jose. The season would feature an entirely new opening credits sequence and a return to the franchise's cinematic aesthetics, as well as reviving storylines from its earliest seasons. The season's return to its roots was well received by fans and critics, with writer Michael Arceneaux describing the season's premiere double episode as "magnifique".

On December 11, 2019, VH1 announced Love & Hip Hop: Miami would return for a third season on January 6, 2020, with Joseline Hernandez returning to the franchise after three years. The premiere episode garnered 1.41 million viewers, up from its previous season's rating of 1.09 million viewers. This is the first time that ratings in the franchise have improved since season six of Love & Hip Hop: Atlanta. Despite being credited as a main cast member for the entire season and heavily featured in its promotional material, Joseline disappeared from the show entirely after four episodes, after a series of interviews in which she criticised producer Mona Scott-Young, dismissing her as a "talent scout". In her absence, ratings once again began to decline.

On February 18, 2020, VH1 announced Love & Hip Hop: Atlanta would return for a ninth season on March 16, 2020. Love & Hip Hop: New Yorks mid-season finale aired on March 9, 2020, with VH1 announcing that it would return in spring. On an episode of his podcast, released on March 26, 2020, Joe Budden confirmed the show was still filming, despite the growing COVID-19 pandemic. Production was affected by the pandemic, with cast members filming their green screen confessional scenes while quarantined at home. Love & Hip Hop: Atlantas mid-season finale would air on May 11, 2020, and feature behind-scenes footage of production being shut down by the virus.

Filming on the franchise was put on hold from May 6, 2020, with the remaining episodes of Love & Hop: New York and Love & Hip Hop: Atlanta, as well as season seven of Love & Hip Hop: Hollywood and season four of Love & Hip Hop: Miami, postponed until further notice. On June 12, 2020, VH1 announced that they had severed their relationship with Big Fish Entertainment, after their reality show Live PD was canceled due to the handling of the video footage of the killing of Javier Ambler, and due to the protests against police brutality in the wake of the murder of George Floyd.

Reboot (2021–present)
On October 8, 2020, Mona Scott-Young confirmed VH1 were working on a reimagining of the franchise, to be produced in-house. On December 3, 2020, it was reported that two new spin-offs were in production and set to premiere in 2021, one features various couples from the franchise's history, and another featuring cast members from Love & Hip Hop: Atlanta, Hollywood and Miami living together in an Arizona hotel.

On December 10, 2020, VH1 announced the four part special Love & Hip Hop: Secrets Unlocked, a reunion special hosted by Kendall Kyndall and featuring cast members from New York, Atlanta, Hollywood and Miami. The special premiered on January 4, 2021.

On January 12, 2021, VH1 announced Love & Hip Hop: It's a Love Thing, a special featuring various Love & Hip Hop couples, would air on February 1, 2021, followed by VH1 Family Reunion: Love & Hip Hop Edition, a six-part spin-off show featuring cast members from New York, Atlanta, Hollywood and Miami, on February 8. This was followed by VH1 Couples Retreat on April 19, another six-part show featuring Love & Hip Hop couples, including New Yorks Yandy Smith and Mendeecees Harris, Atlantas Rasheeda and Kirk Frost, and Hollywoods Ray J and Princess Love, along with Flavor of Loves Deelishis and Raymond Santana, and comedian Michael Blackson and Rada.

On June 7, 2021, VH1 announced that Love & Hip Hop: Atlanta would return for a tenth season on July 5, 2021. The season was preceded by the special Love & Hip Hop Atlanta: Inside the A on June 28, 2021. The season crossed over cast members from both New York and Atlanta and focused more on social justice and the Black Lives Matter movement than previous seasons. The season premiere was the first in the show's history to garner under a million viewers, with ratings dropping with each episode.

On August 9, 2021, VH1 announced that Love & Hip Hop: Miami would return for a fourth season on August 23, 2021. The season would be preceded by the special Love & Hip Hop: Miami: Inside the 305 on August 16, 2021.

On November 9, 2021, VH1 announced that VH1 Family Reunion: Love & Hip Hop Edition would return for a second season on December 13, 2021, featuring more cast members from New York, Atlanta, Hollywood and Miami. The show was followed by a two-part special, Love & Hip Hop: Lineage to Legacy, which aired from February 7, 2022 and explored the ancestry of various Love & Hip Hop cast members in the vein of Who Do You Think You Are.

On July 11, 2022, VH1 announced that additional episodes for both Love & Hip Hop: Atlantas tenth season and Love & Hip Hop: Miamis fourth season would air together from August 8, 2022. A four-part special, Love & Hip Hop: Where Are They Now?, featuring past cast members from all four franchises, began airing from October 31, 2022. On November 8, 2022, VH1 announced that VH1 Family Reunion: Love & Hip Hop Edition would return for a third season on November 28, 2022.

Proposed spin-offs
Since 2013, Mona Scott-Young has discussed expanding the franchise to other cities, such as Chicago, New Orleans, Detroit and Houston.

On February 28, 2016, it was reported that potential spin-offs set in Miami and Houston were in pre-production and the producers were auditioning potential cast members. However, Scott-Young denied reports of a spin-off being filmed in New Orleans, saying "I would love to do a show there but there is no Love & Hip Hop: New Orleans being cast or shot right now." Love & Hip Hop: Houston was to feature Jhonni Blaze, Kirko Bangz, Kat St. John, Just Brittany, Nessacary, J. Prince Jr, Propain, the Sauce Twinz, the Charlo Brothers, DJ Eric, Lil' Keith, and Mehgan James as cast members. However, the show was put on hold indefinitely midway through filming in June 2016 due to concerns for the crew's safety, after several shoots were shut down by cast violence, as well as locals interrupting filming. On July 7, 2017, Scott-Young said "Houston I love. We wanted to do Houston and we went into Houston to cast and we may go back to Houston." In 2021, VH1 revealed that Megan Thee Stallion auditioned for Love & Hip Hop: Houston before her career took off.

On September 23, 2014, Tammy Rivera and Waka Flocka Flame announced on social media that they would be leaving Love & Hip Hop: Atlanta to star in their own spin-off show Meet The Flockas. However, the series never eventuated and Rivera returned to the main cast of Love & Hip Hop: Atlanta in 2016. On October 11, 2017, Waka confirmed that Meet The Flockas was in production and would be produced by Mona Scott-Young. Earlier on July 24, 2017, Safaree Samuels announced that he would be starring in his own spin-off Wild Safaree. Neither spin-offs ever made it to air, and Waka and Tammy would instead go on to star in We TV's Marriage Boot Camp: Hip Hop Edition, Waka & Tammy Tie The Knot and Growing Up Hip Hop: Atlanta. On February 25, 2019, Solo Lucci announced that he would be starring in his own dating show spin-off I Love Lucci. The show was to be hosted by Ray J and produced by Mona Scott Young, however it never made it to air and it is unclear if it was to be considered a part of the Love & Hip Hop franchise.

Series overview

Spin-offs

Specials

Awards and nominations

International versions

References

External links
 Love & Hip Hop: New York
 Love & Hip Hop: Atlanta
 Love & Hip Hop: Hollywood
 Love & Hip Hop Live: The Wedding
 Love & Hip Hop: Out in Hip Hop

 
VH1 original programming
Hip hop television
African-American reality television series
Reality television series franchises
Television franchises